UNiDAYS is a discount website founded in 2011 that is available for free to students worldwide. Current students in higher education can sign up with UNiDAYS to get discounted deals on products and services.

References 

Websites